William Pennington Cocks (1791-1878) was an English surgeon naturalist principally interested in marine fauna.
He was born in Devon. Owing to ill-health, when he was still only 51, he retired to Falmouth in Cornwall.
He described the nudibranch Aeolidiella alderi and the sea anemone Anthopleura ballii.

Publications 
partial list
List of Echinodermata procured in Falmouth and neighbourhood from 1843-1849 Trans. Penz. Nat. Hist. Ant. Soc. 1 :292.  
Common objects of the sea-shore Falmouth. 
Nudibranchiate Mollusca Quarto pp. 8. Falmouth. 
Chitons Quarto pp. 12. Falmouth.Salt Water Mollusca Quarto pp. 16. Falmouth. 
Hints for facilitating the Records of Natural History Quarto. Falmouth.

Thirty papers, many undated, are listed in Boase and Courtenay (1874)

References

External links
Journal of Conchology
National Archives

English naturalists
British malacologists
1878 deaths
1791 births